The Adelphi Mill is the only surviving historic mill in Prince George's County, Maryland. It is the oldest and largest mill in the Washington, D.C. area.

History
The Adelphi Mill and Storehouse is located on the Northwest Branch of the Anacostia River at 8401 & 8402 Riggs Road in Adelphi, Maryland. It was built in 1796, and originally operated by two brothers, Issacher and Mahlon Schofield.  It was given the name "Adelphi" after the original land patent title.  The mill was used to both grind grain and to card wool.  In the early-19th century, ships came up the Northwest Branch to deliver raw goods and pickup finished materials.  In the mid-19th century, the mill was part of the Green Hill estate of George Washington Riggs and renamed Riggs Mill. The mill was operated by the Freeman family until 1916.  In the early 1920s, it became part of the Langley Park estate of Leander McCormick-Goodhart.  In 1950, Mr. McCormick-Goodhart transferred the mill and surrounding  to the Maryland-National Capital Park and Planning Commission (M-NCPPC).  The mill was subsequently restored and reopened in 1954, as a community center with the old machinery and grinding wheels on display.  It is also known as the Adelphi Mill Recreation Center, M-NCPPC.  Also on this property is the small stone storehouse built into the slope on the opposite side of the road at 8401 Riggs Road."

Gallery

See also
 Northwest Branch Trail

References

This article contains information from the Maryland National Capital Park and Planning Commission's page on the Adelphi Mill.

External links
Adelphi Mill, Department of Parks and Recreation, M-NCPPC Prince George's County
Historic Marker Database, Adelphi Mill marker
 Online Exhibit: Prince George's County Celebrates 300 years of history 1696-1996; Riggs Mill waterwheel photograph, 1912
M-NCPPC Inventory of Historic Sites (Prince George's County); Adelphi Mill and Storehouse, entry 65-006, p. 36

Riggs Mill Thesis presented to Tau Beta Pi, April 28, 1930, by William Edward Roberts 8 photos and sketch of mill race

Adelphi, Maryland
Grinding mills in Maryland
Buildings and structures in Prince George's County, Maryland
Historic American Buildings Survey in Maryland
Industrial buildings completed in 1796
1796 establishments in Maryland